Anna Andreyevna Gorshkova (born 28 November 1983) is a Russian actress and model, who made her debut as Polina Penkova in the 2003 soap opera Bednaya Nastya.

Biography
Gorshkova was born in Moscow, Russian SFSR, Soviet Union. Her father, Andrei Gorshkov, worked in the KGB, and her mother, Tatiana, graduated from the Plekhanov Institute of National Economy, but after the birth of Anna devoted herself to raising her daughter. Gorshkova's parents divorced when she was four years old and her father immigrated to the United States. Despite this, she and her father kept a great relationship.

Filmography

Films

Television

References

External links 

1983 births
Living people
Russian television actresses
Russian film actresses
Actresses from Moscow
Russian female models
State University of Management alumni